"The Imperial Physician" is a short story by the Chinese writer Pu Songling collected in Strange Tales from a Chinese Studio in 1740, and translated by Sidney L. Sondergard in 2012.

Plot
Sun Pingshi (孙评事) has devoted all his effort to attaining an imperial degree, so as to honour his deceased mother who was windowed at the age of nineteen, during the Wanli Emperor reign, and led a life of chastity hereafter. Finally, he earns the highest possible title of jinshi. However, he becomes very sick one day  just a few days short of formally becoming a civil servant. On the verge of death, he beckons for the imperial physician, but by the time of his arrival, Sun has already died, his eyes still open after realising that he would still have failed in honouring his mother, in that he led a life without fame and prestige.

The imperial physician is briefed of the situation, and uses moxibustion to revive Sun. Before leaving, the doctor warns Sun not to consume any tiger or bear meat. Given the scarcity of such meats, though, Sun does not place much significance on the physician's warning. A week later, the crown prince is born and Sun attends the royal banquet held in celebration of the joyous occasion. He enjoys a spread of sumptuous food "sweet and refreshing beyond compare". The next day, he discovers that he had eaten bear's paw, and dies soon after.

Themes and literary significance
A review of "The Imperial Physician" in a 1992 collection of International Papers on Liaozhai remarks that Pu Songling, in reviving Sun Pingshi from the dead, only to have him die again, is characteristically highlighting the inevitability of fate, whilst placing the protagonist in a limbo. Further to the idea of inevitability is the fact that Sun unknowingly seals his own doom by consuming meat whose origins he is unaware of. The author notes that Pu frequently references the theme of "underdetermination" as seen in other stories like "Wang Zian". Another key theme in "The Imperial Physician" is filial piety; his sole motivation for becoming a jinshi is to make his mother proud, and so great is his love for his mother that he is unable to die in peace without having done her proud.

In his essay "How to Make a Story Beautiful: On Aesthetic Dialectics of Liao zhai zhi yi", Li Hong-xiang lists The Imperial Physician as an example of how Pu shows that "the dialectics of unexpected but reasonable change of things is not only used in events concerning supernatural power, but also human life". "(T)hat things go from the expected to the contrary direction", as seen in how the imperial physician's advice is dismissed given the rarity of bear and tiger meat, yet Sun Pingshi meets such an "unexpected but fatal" death nonetheless.

See also

 Chinese literature
 Chinese philosophy

References

Citations

Bibliography

 
 

Stories within Strange Tales from a Chinese Studio